William Gore Willson (November 4, 1882 – January 24, 1953) was a Canadian politician. He represented Niagara Falls in the Legislative Assembly of Ontario from 1923 to 1934 as a member of the Conservative Party. He died of a heart attack in 1953.

References

External links 
 

1882 births
1953 deaths
People from Fort Erie, Ontario
Progressive Conservative Party of Ontario MPPs